Verkhnetroitskoye is a rural locality (a selo) and the administrative centre of Verkhnetroitsky Selsoviet, Tuymazinsky District, Bashkortostan, Russia. The population was 816 as of 2010. There are 10 streets.

Geography 
Verkhnetroitskoye is located 32 km south of Tuymazy (the district's administrative centre) by road. Frunze is the nearest rural locality.

References 

Rural localities in Tuymazinsky District